The short-footed Luzon tree rat or greater dwarf cloud rat (Carpomys melanurus) is a species of rodent in the family Muridae. It is found only in the Philippines, specifically in northern Luzon. Its natural habitat is tropical moist montane forests.

This species was long thought to be extinct. In 2008, Filipino researchers including Dr. Danilo Balete found a specimen in the canopy of Mount Pulag National Park, the first scientifically observed individual of the species since 1896. The captured individual was "about 185 grams and has dense soft reddish-brown fur, a black mask around large dark eyes, small rounded ears, a broad and blunt snout and a long tail covered with dark hair".

References

Rats of Asia
Carpomys
Endemic fauna of the Philippines
Rodents of the Philippines
Fauna of Luzon
Mammals described in 1895
Taxa named by Oldfield Thomas
Taxonomy articles created by Polbot